The Jammu and Kashmir Football Association (JKFA) is one of the 37 Indian state football associations affiliated to the All India Football Federation.

Background 
The Jammu and Kashmir Football Association is the governing body for football in Jammu and Kashmir. It was formed and granted recognition by Jammu & Kashmir State Sports Council and the All India Football Federation in 1964. Since 1964 the association has been qualified to take part in the Santosh Trophy and all other competitions in the country.

JKFA organises the Jammu & Kashmir Premier Football League.

See also 
 Sports in Jammu and Kashmir

References

External links
 

Football governing bodies in India
Football in Jammu and Kashmir
1964 establishments in Jammu and Kashmir
Sports organizations established in 1964